Snowy may refer to:

People
People with the given name or nickname Snowy include:
 Snowy Baker (1884–1953), Australian athlete, sports promoter, and actor
 Snowy Evans (c. 1891–1925), Australian machine gunner credited with firing the shot that killed Manfred von Richthofen ("The Red Baron")
 Snowy Farr (1919–2007), English charity fundraiser for the Guide Dogs for the Blind Association
 Snowy Khoza, South African business executive
 Snowy Rowles (died 1932), Australian perpetrator of the Murchison Murders
 Snowy Shaw (born 1968), Swedish heavy metal musician
 Snowy Svenson or Kenneth Svenson (1898–1955), New Zealand rugby union player

Other uses
 Snowy (character), a fictional dog in the comics series The Adventures of Tintin by Hergé
 Snowy (military dog) (2004–2011), a tracking dog for the Sri Lanka Army
 Snowy (TV series), a 1993 Australian television drama series
 "Snowy", a track from the soundtrack of the 2015 video game Undertale by Toby Fox

See also
 Snowy River (disambiguation)